Sparganothoides probolosana is a species of moth of the family Tortricidae. It is found in the Sierra Madre Occidental of western Durango in Mexico.

The length of the forewings is 10.9–12 mm. Adults are dimorphic in colour. The ground colour of the forewings is either golden yellow or brownish orange with speckling of orange and dark brown scales. The hindwings are greyish white.

Etymology
The species name refers to the protuberances of the head and is derived from Greek probolos (meaning projecting).

References

Moths described in 2009
Sparganothoides